Azygocypridina is a genus of ostracods in the family Cypridinidae, which appears to be "the least derived living ostracod", having remained largely unchanged for 350 million years. It contains the following species:
Azygocypridina africanus (Stebbing, 1902)
Azygocypridina birsteini Rudjakov, 1961
Azygocypridina brynmawria Diamond, de Forges & Kornicker, 2008
Azygocypridina gibber (Muller, 1906)
Azygocypridina grimaldii (Granata, 1919)
Azygocypridina imperator (Brady, 1880)
Azygocypridina imperialis (Stebbing, 1901)
Azygocypridina lowryi Kornicker, 1985
Azygocypridina ohtai Hiruta, 1981
Azygocypridina rudjakovi Kornicker, 1970

References

Myodocopida
Ostracod genera